Jesús Nogueiras Santiago (born in Santa Clara, Cuba, July 17, 1959) is a Cuban chess grandmaster. He was a World Championship Candidate in 1985, finishing 2nd at the Taxco 1985 Interzonal, but 15th out of 16 at the 1985 Candidates Tournament.

Major tournament victories include winning the Cuban Chess Championship five times (1977 (tie), 1978, 1984 (tie), 1991, and 2000) the Capablanca Memorial in 1984 and the Torre Memorial in 1997.

External links

1959 births
Chess grandmasters
Chess Olympiad competitors
Cuban chess players
Living people